Immaculate Heart of Mary (IHM) Seminary is a Roman Catholic, Diocesan-sponsored college seminary in Winona, Minnesota. Located adjacent to the campus of Saint Mary's University of Minnesota, IHM Seminary has provided college-level seminary training since 1948.  Seminarians from various dioceses across the United States live at IHM Seminary and take classes from Saint Mary's University of Minnesota. While the current bishop of the Diocese of Winona-Rochester, the Most Reverend Robert E. Barron, is the president of the advisory board, the rector of the seminary oversees the day-to-day activities.

History

The early years
In 1912, Bishop Patrick Richard Heffron of the Diocese of Winona, founded Saint Mary's College (now Saint Mary's University) on the terraced heights of Winona's Gilmore valley.  Bishop Heffron founded the all-male college just two years after being ordained the second bishop of the Winona Diocese.  Saint Mary's was founded for the higher education of all young men, but especially for the formation and education of future priests.

By 1933, Saint Mary's College was transferred from the Diocese of Winona to the Brothers of the Christian Schools (De La Salle Christian Brothers). This transfer, however, was not completed for ten years due to the fact that the Holy See viewed Saint Mary's as an approved seminary. The transfer was begun was Bishop Francis Martin Kelly and completed by Coadjutor Bishop Leo Binz.

By 1947, five years after the completed transfer of Saint Mary's to the Christian Brothers, Bishop Binz requested advice from Archbishop Amleto Cicognani, the Apostolic Delegate at the time, about beginning a diocesan seminary in Winona where seminarians would live at Saint Mary's and take classes therein. By the fall of 1947, a core group of students became the first seminary students at Saint Mary's and were taught by Fathers George Henry Speltz and William Magee, both priests of the Diocese of Winona.

The founding years
Just a year after Bishop Binz's request for advice from Archbishop Cicognani, Immaculate Heart of Mary (IHM) Seminary was founded and canonically erected on July 16, 1948. Father George Speltz, one of the priest-faculty members of Saint Mary's College, was named the first rector. During its founding year, IHM had an enrollment of twenty-five students. The following year, 1949, the first seminarian, Paul Halloran, graduated from IHM Seminary.

In 1950, Bishop Edward Aloysius Fitzgerald became the fourth bishop of Winona and completed the architectural plans for a new seminary dormitory. The Christian Brothers deeded a plot of land from Saint Mary's College to the Diocese of Winona for the construction of the seminary building. Ground was broken by Bishop Fitzgerald on May 1, 1950, and the cornerstone was laid by Archbishop Binz, then the coadjutor of Dubuque.

In the spring of 1951, just four years after the request of advice from Archbishop Cicognani, the first students moved into the new seminary building, Kelly Hall, named in honor of Bishop Francis Kelly, the third bishop of Winona and the bishop who began the process of transferring Saint Mary's College to the Christian Brothers. The altar in the Saint John Vianney Chapel of Kelly Hall was dedicated on April 22, 1951, by Bishop Fitzgerald and on March 2, 1952, the first Solemn Mass was celebrated by Father Speltz in the chapel.

The continuing years
Shortly after the completion of Kelly Hall, construction on Mary Hall (nowadays referred to as the Convent or Guesthouse) was undertaken. Mary Hall was completed in 1954 and became the home for the first Dominican Sisters who undertook domestic duties at the seminary.

Ten years after the completion of Kelly Hall, Saint Leo the Great Hall was completed in 1961.  It was blessed by the Apostolic Delegate, Archbishop Egidio Vagnozzi, on March 25, 1962.  Archbishop Leo Binz, in whose honor the building was named, was present during the blessing ceremony.  By 1974, the Fitzgerald Retreat Center would be housed in Leo Hall. The Retreat Center, named in honor of Bishop Fitzgerald, would be the home of diocesan priest retreats.

In 1963, Father Speltz was named Auxiliary Bishop of Winona and Bishop Fitzgerald named Monsignor Joseph McGinnis as the second rector of IHM Seminary. Shortly thereafter, during the 1966–1967 academic year, the highest total enrollment was reached at ninety seminarians studying at IHM Seminary.  The third rector, Monsignor Roy Literski, was appointed by Bishop Fitzgerald in 1968.

1970 brought some changes to IHM Seminary.  Post-conciliar reform lead to the remodeling of the Saint John Vianney Chapel. Bishop Loras Watters, fifth bishop of Winona, named Father Robert Brom as rector.  Other changes occurred with the religious sisters as the Dominicans returned to Switzerland and the School Sisters of Notre Dame took over domestic duties.

The post–silver anniversary years
1973 brought the twenty-fifth anniversary of IHM Seminary; an alumni gathering was held in June of that year.    During 1986–1987, IHM Seminary was studied under the Papal Seminary Study and the chapel was renovated again in 1986.  In June 1988, a fortieth-anniversary alumni reunion was held at IHM.  Just a year later, in 1989, the IHM Seminary Endowment fund was created.

Beginning in 1994, IHM Seminary and the priest faculty and staff began all sacramental ministry at Saint Mary's College, which was renamed a university in 1995. The second Papal Seminary Study was undertaken in the fall of 2005 and minor renovations of Kelly Hall were completed throughout 2002–2008.  In August 2006, ground was broken on the Pope John Paul II Memorial Garden, located in front of Kelly Hall. The garden, completed by the summer of 2007 and is formed in the shape of the Celtic cross that is located atop of the bell tower of the seminary. Located within the garden are the Stations of the Cross by American artist Lynn Kircher, a fountain, and an outdoor grotto with altar for outdoor Masses.

In 2016 the seminary began a major renovation of Kelly Hall. This led to the seminary community being relocated to a campus dorm for a year while updates were made to the building. In conjunction with this renovation, two years later in 2018 a four-story addition was completed to connect both halls of the seminary. This made space for both study and community rooms on each of the residence floors.

Faculty
Very Rev. Robert S. Horihan is the current Rector of the seminary. He was appointed by Bishop John M. Quinn in 2016.
Rev. Martin T. Schaefer is the current Vice-Rector and Dean of Formation.
Rev. Jeffery L. Dobbs is the current Director of Spiritual Life.
Rev. Jason L. Kern is the current Vocation Director for the Diocese of Winona-Rochester and a member of the formation faculty.

Buildings
Kelly Hall is the original seminary building, built during 1950–1951.  The construction contracts were awarded on April 25, 1950, and Bishop Edward Fitzgerald broke ground for the building on May 1, 1950. The cornerstone of Kelly Hall was laid by Archbishop Leo Binz on June 15, 1950, with all priests of the diocese present.  Students moved into the building on March 3, 1951.  Kelly Hall houses the main student residence, guest suites, seminary offices, and the Saint John Vianney Chapel.
Leo Hall (officially Saint Leo the Great Hall) was built adjacent to Kelly Hall in 1961 and named after IHM's founder, Bishop Leo Binz.  It was blessed by the Apostolic Delegate, Archbishop Egidio Vagnozzi, in 1962.  Archbishop Binz was present for the ceremony.  Today, Leo Hall houses the secondary student residence, guest rooms as well as the Sedes Sapientiæ Chapel, named in honor of Mary under the title of Our Lady Seat of Wisdom.

Chapels
 Saint John Vianney Chapel.  The Saint John Vianney Chapel (SJV Chapel), named after the Curé d'Ars, Saint John Vianney, is the main chapel of Immaculate Heart of Mary Seminary.  Located in the center of Kelly Hall, the SJV Chapel is the heart of the seminary and the site of daily liturgical functions.  The Blessed Sacrament is reserved in the SJV Chapel and there is daily Mass and adoration of the Blessed Sacrament. As the SJV Chapel is the main chapel for the seminary, lauds and vespers are prayed in common in the chapel.  The stained-glass windows of the chapel depict various saints as well as the gifts of the Holy Spirit. The stained-glass windows in the sanctuary depict the archangels Michael, Gabriel, and Raphael.
Sedes Sapientiæ Chapel.  The Sedes Sapientiæ Chapel, located in Leo Hall, is a smaller devotional chapel of Immaculate Heart of Mary Seminary used for devotions and private prayer. The Blessed Sacrament is reserved in this chapel. It is named in honor of the Blessed Virgin Mary under the title of Our Lady, Seat of Wisdom.  Seminarians often meet in small groups to pray various devotions (such as the Rosary) or the Liturgy of the Hours in this chapel.  Masses with smaller congregations are held in this chapel on occasion.  The stained-glass windows depict Mary, Sedes Sapientiæ, and the seven sacraments. It was dedicated by Bishop Bernard Harrington on Oct. 23, 2003.

Pope John Paul II Memorial Garden
Located in the front lawn of Immaculate Heart of Mary Seminary, the Pope John II Memorial Garden is a multi-acre garden that offers a serene and reflective area for seminarians and the general public.  After Pope John Paul II's death in 2005, the rector at that time, was inspired to design a garden to honor the late pontiff.  As the Stations of the Cross were one of the pontiff's favorite devotions, it was decided that the garden would center around the Stations of the Cross.  Ground was broken for the garden in August 2006 and three months later the Stations themselves were installed.  A year after groundbreaking, in August 2007, the centerpiece of the garden, the sculpture of the burial shroud of Christ was installed.

Purpose
The purpose of the Pope John II Memorial Garden is simply to provide additional prayer and reflection areas for seminarians discerning a call to the priesthood and for the general public for devotional use.  The Stations of the Cross can be prayed at one's leisure, taking time for prayer and meditation.  Also, because of the outdoor grotto and altar, the Holy Mass can be celebrated outside on occasion.

Stations of the Cross
Throughout the main part of the Pope John II Memorial Garden, the Stations of the Cross form the outline of a Celtic cross, the same cross that is located on the top of the seminary bell tower.  In addition to the traditional fourteen stations, two extra stations were added off the main path.  These two extra stations are (1) Jesus in the Garden of Gethsemane and (2) the Resurrection of Jesus.  The Stations were designed by American artist Lynn Kircher.

Grotto and altar
Set in local limestone, the outdoor grotto and altar provide a special area for outdoor gatherings and space for the Holy Mass.  The area is dedicated to the Blessed Mother, with statues of Our Lady and Our Lady of Guadalupe, and provides space for votive candles and private prayer.

Shroud of Christ
Located in the center of the garden is the empty tomb of Christ, with a life-sized solid bronze burial shroud, designed by Lynn Kircher.  Located throughout the center of the garden, cast bronze birds perch on the outdoor works of art.

"New Life" water feature
As the waters flows naturally down the boulder, the sounds of trickling water can be heard throughout the garden. The boulder also reminds visitors of the water God provided for the ancient Israelites brought forth from the rock by Moses.

About the artist
Lynn Kircher is a full-time artist living in Jaroso, Colorado.  An art teacher for nearly twenty years, Kircher pioneered programs and processes which live on through his students.  In 1997, he turned his passion for sculpture and became a full-time artist.  His art has been accepted into the Vatican Collection and he was interviewed by Pope John Paul II in 2002.

Intellectual Formation
The majority of students who study at Immaculate Heart of Mary Seminary do not come to IHM in possession of a bachelor's degree.  Because of this fact, students study at IHM and Saint Mary's University to earn a Bachelor of Arts (B.A.) degree.  The seminarians major in a specially designed philosophy major.  Other courses in theology and Latin are also required.  Students are free to double major or minor in fields of their choice so long as all the philosophical requirements are met.

Sacred Mission
Flowing from its responsibility to build God's Kingdom on Earth, Immaculate Heart of Mary Seminary (IHMS) nurtures and heartens a man's calling from God to the ministerial priesthood.  IHMS strengthens and deepens the seminarian's personal commitment to Jesus Christ with the highest quality programs of spiritual, intellectual, pastoral, and human formation.  While supporting and encouraging the development of each man's natural gifts, IHMS strives to help the men discern and answer God's call with hearts on fire!

Seminary Motto and Crest
The official motto of Immaculate Heart of Mary Seminary is the Latin text of Psalm 133:1: Ecce quam bonum et quam iucundum habitare fratres, fratres in unum (Behold how good and how splendid where brothers dwell as one.)  The Latin motto is often shortened to simply Ecce Quam Bonum (Behold How Good) as seen on the seminary crest.

The crest used by IHMS was designed by the ninth rector, Father James Steffes. It is steeped in imagery and symbolism from the long traditions of the Catholic Church. The crest was created in 2002 for the 60th anniversary of the patronage to the Immaculate Heart by Pope Pius XII in 1942. The base of the crest is the red shield, symbolizing both the enlightening guidance of the Holy Spirit and the courage needed to respond to God's call of discernment. At the top of the shield is a flur-de-lis, a symbol of Mary as well as of Joseph, the guardian of Jesus and disciples dedicated to Him. At its center, the crest holds Mary's mystical rose, often portrayed with five petals, in white within a blue diamond. Both the diamond and color white are symbols of virgins, and blue is the traditional color of Mary. Within the mystical rose is the Immaculate Heart of our Heavenly Queen. The banner across the bottom is the IHM motto, "Ecce Quam Bonum" which is Latin for "Ecce quam bonum et quam jucundum habitare fratres, frates in unum" (Ps 133:1). In English, "Behold how good and how splendid it is where brothers dwell as one."

In 2019 the seminary began updating branding. This led to a new logo being used for official correspondence instead of the traditional crest.

Apostolic Visitations
Immaculate Heart of Mary Seminary was visited by Vatican-appointed representatives during the Papal Seminary Study in February 1986 under the chairmanship of Bishop William H. Keeler of Harrisburg.  The next apostolic visitation occurred in November 2005 when all U.S. seminaries and houses of formation were visited by Vatican-appointed representatives.

Dioceses currently served
Archdiocese of Milwaukee
Diocese of Crookston
Diocese of Gary
Diocese of Madison
Diocese of Peoria
Diocese of Rapid City
Diocese of Saint Cloud
Diocese of Sioux Falls
Diocese of Winona-Rochester
Diocese of Duluth
Diocese of Sioux City
Diocese of Cheyenne
Diocese of La Crosse

External links
  Saint Mary's University of Minnesota
 Immaculate Heart of Mary Seminary
 Roman Catholic Diocese of Winona, Minnesota

References

Roman Catholic Ecclesiastical Province of Saint Paul and Minneapolis
Catholic universities and colleges in Minnesota
Catholic seminaries in the United States
Catholic organizations established in the 20th century
Education in Winona County, Minnesota
Educational institutions established in 1948
Religious organizations established in 1948
Buildings and structures in Winona County, Minnesota
1948 establishments in Minnesota